In 1944, Billboard magazine published its first chart ranking the top-performing country music songs in the United States, under the title Most Played Juke Box Folk Records. The term "country music" would not come into standard usage until the late 1940s and "folk music" was one of a number of terms used for the genre in earlier years; the subtitle on the first chart indicated that it covered "Hillbillies, Spirituals, Cowboy Songs, etc". The Juke Box Folk listing was compiled based on reports from "Billboard representatives" detailing the most-played songs of the genre in jukeboxes from "all the country's leading operating centers", which were averaged to give an overall chart. The first chart listed six songs, but the number of entries was not consistent from week to week. The juke box chart was published under a number of different titles until 1957 and is considered part of the lineage of the current Hot Country Songs chart, which was first published in 1958.

The first number-one song listed was "Pistol Packin' Mama", which remained in the top spot for the first seven weeks. The song, originally recorded by Al Dexter in 1942, had remained hugely popular ever since, and been recorded by many different singers. Up to four different versions of "Pistol Packin' Mama" were bracketed together as a single entry in the number one position during the seven-week run, although noted chart historian Joel Whitburn regards only the first-named artist each week as having achieved the number one hit, and does not record some of the credited artists as having charted at all. Subsequently, different recordings of a song were not bracketed together in this way: in later issues of Billboard, different versions of "Pistol Packin' Mama" appeared listed separately. The chart methodology also allowed for the possibility of records tying for a position, and on several occasions during 1944 two or more different songs tied for the number-one spot.

Counting all seven weeks in which his version of "Pistol Packin' Mama" was bracketed with other artists' recordings of the same song and counting each of his two songs which tied for the top spot in the issue of Billboard dated April 15 as having one week at number one, Al Dexter spent the highest number of weeks at the top of the chart in 1944, with 24. If the first five weeks of the chart, for which Whitburn does not give Dexter credit as having achieved a number one, are discounted, he nonetheless still had the most weeks in the top spot. Dexter was also the artist with the most different songs at number one in 1944, topping the chart with "Pistol Packin' Mama", "Rosalita", "Too Late to Worry" and "So Long Pal". Louis Jordan was the only other artist to top the chart with more than one song during the year. Red Foley had the longest unbroken run at number one, spending thirteen consecutive weeks in the top spot in the fall with the patriotic wartime song "Smoke on the Water". Al Dexter's "So Long Pal" spent the same number of weeks at number one, but split across seven different spells at the top. The final number one of the year was "I'm Wastin' My Tears on You" by Tex Ritter, who is one of three acts to top the chart in 1944 who are members of the Country Music Hall of Fame, the others being Ernest Tubb and Red Foley.

Chart history

a.  Multiple recordings of the same song were listed together.  Joel Whitburn regards only the first act listed as having been number one in the week in question, and does not list Baxter, Peltyn and Fisher's versions as having charted at all.
b.  Multiple songs tied for the number one position.

See also
1944 in music
1944 in country music
List of artists who reached number one on the U.S. country chart

References

1944
Country
1944 record charts